The KeyBank Tournament (initially the I Love New York Tournament) was a college Division I men's ice hockey tournament played before New Years at the 1980 Olympic Arena in Lake Placid, New York.

The tournament was first held in November 1980, after which it was moved to late December as a holiday tournament. For the third tournament in 1982 KeyBank became the sponsor and the tournament was renamed accordingly. KeyBank ended their sponsorship after the 6th championship and when no other funding came about the tournament was discontinued.

Yearly results

Team records

References

College ice hockey tournaments in the United States
College sports in New York (state)
Ice hockey in New York (state)
Sports competitions in New York (state)